Anna Reynolds may refer to:

Anna Reynolds (writer), British novelist, playwright, and screenwriter
Anna Reynolds (singer), English opera singer
Anna Reynolds (mayor), Australian politician, lord mayor of Hobart